Craigiebuckler is a residential area of Aberdeen, Scotland.

It is around 2 miles south west of the city centre. The local schools are Hazlehead Primary School and Hazlehead Academy.

Craigiebuckler church was designed by the Aberdeen architect Robert Gordon Wilson in 1873 and remodelled by James Matthews in 1882.

References

Areas of Aberdeen